Canada–Mongolia relations are foreign relations between Canada and Mongolia. Both countries established diplomatic relations on November 30, 1973.  Canada has been represented in Mongolia through an embassy since 2008.  Mongolia has an embassy in Ottawa, and in 2002 opened an Honorary Consulate in Toronto. Though Canada and Mongolia established diplomatic ties in 1973, ad hoc linkages and minor activities occurred between the two countries mainly through the Canada-Mongolia Society, which disbanded in 1980.  When Mongolia formed a democratic government in 1991 after the collapse of the Soviet Union, Canada began to support Mongolia with donor activities through the International Development Research Centre, Canadian International Development Agency and several non-governmental organizations.

Timeline
The following events occurred as diplomatic relations were established and ties strengthened:
1973 Diplomatic relations were established
2001 Embassy opens in Ottawa
2002 Honorary Consulate of Mongolia opened in Toronto
2003 Honorary Consulate of Mongolia opened in Calgary, Alberta
2008 Canada's first resident Ambassador to Mongolia Anna Biolik presented her credentials to the President of Mongolia

Embassy and consulates

The Embassy of Mongolia in Canada is located at 132 Stanley Avenue, Ottawa, Ontario, Canada. Mongolia opened its embassy in Canada on July 1, 2001.  Mongolia also maintains Honorary Consulates in Vancouver, Montreal, Calgary, and Regina.

The Embassy of Canada in Mongolia is located in Ulaanbaatar at the Sükhbaatar Square.

State visits

1994 - Tserenpiliyn Gombosuren, the minister for foreign affairs of Mongolia visited Canada.
2004 - Mongolian President Natsagiin Bagabandi made a 7-day official visit to Canada in 2004. After a meeting with Prime Minister Paul Martin, the leaders stated that regular Canadian-Mongolian Roundtable meetings, discussing relations between the two countries and other areas of mutual interest, should be held.
2010 - September visit by Mongolian Prime Minister S. Batbold to Ottawa, Toronto and Vancouver
2013 - October, Canada's Governor General David Johnston conducted a state visit to Mongolia.
2014 - July, Canada's Minister of Foreign Affairs John Baird conducted an official visit to Mongolia

Agreements
2002 The Tourism Union of Mongolia and the UK Ecological Tourism Organization signed an agreement. It was signed by U. Damdinsuren, the president of the Tourism Union of Mongolia, and the UK ambassador, Philip Rouse.

Trade
Canada is the second largest investor in Mongolia. There are 20 mining and exploration firms that as of 2008 invested approximately $400 million in Mongolia. Ivanhoe Mines and Rio Tinto Group are in disagreement with Mongolia over the sharing of profits of the Oyu Tolgoi copper and gold mine.

The Canada-Mongolia Chamber of Commerce, established in 2014, helps to connect businesses and people in both countries. The chamber advocates a sustainable and competitive business environment for all businesses and communities in Canada and Mongolia.

See also 

 Foreign relations of Canada
 Foreign relations of Mongolia

References

External links 
 Official website of Mongol embassy
 Mongol embassy in Ottawa (archived)
 Official website of Canadian embassy
  Canadian Ministry of Foreign Affairs and International Trade about relations with Mongolia
 Canada Mongolia Chamber of Commerce
 Canadian Alumni of Mongolia

 
Mongolia
Bilateral relations of Mongolia
Mongolia
Ottawa